Mason "Dipper" Pines is a fictional character and one of the two lead characters in the Disney Channel animated series Gravity Falls. The character is voiced by Jason Ritter, and is loosely based on the childhood of series creator Alex Hirsch. Dipper appears in all the episodes of Gravity Falls alongside Mabel Pines, his twin sister. Beside his presence in the main series, he appears in the Gravity Falls mini-series titled "Dipper's Guide to the Unexplained" and the shorts "Fixin' it with Soos" and "Mabel's Guide to Life".

Two alternate reality versions of Dipper are featured in Rick and Morty media and Gravity Falls: Lost Legends: Mortipper Pines–Smith, a composite character of Dipper and Morty Smith, and Mabipper Pines, a combined version of Dipper and Mabel, with the former character featuring in the Rick and Morty episodes "Close Rick-counters of the Rick Kind" and "The Ricklantis Mixup", and as a playable character in the video game Pocket Mortys.

Background
The characters of Dipper and his sister Mabel are inspired by the childhood series creator Alex Hirsch and his own twin sister, Ariel Hirsch. As a character, Dipper has been critically well received. He appears in various Gravity Falls merchandise, such as on clothing and in video games.

The shows creator Alex Hirsch has stated, occasionally while Dipper is smart, he is still a kid. In a 2013 Reddit AMA, Hirsch stated that:
"Dipper's smart but he's not a 'WALKING CALCULATOR'. There's a lot of kid shows featuring a character who is 'the brains.' Dipper is better academically than Mabel, but he's also able to laugh at himself. He's a real kid. He has insecurities. He has things that he loves. I try not to pigeonhole these characters into 'ONE TYPE'. They lose their humanity if you do that. (Secret: Dipper's secretly jealous that Mabel's better socially than he is)."

Role in Gravity Falls

Coming from Piedmont, California, Dipper and his twin sister Mabel are forced to spend their summer with their great uncle (grunkle) Stan in the fictional town of Gravity Falls, Oregon. He is portrayed as smart, logical, yet sometimes awkward. He has an interest in mysteries and shows expertise in various areas of knowledge like history, cryptography, and puzzle-solving. 

Dipper first arrives in Gravity Falls bored and upset, but after he accidentally comes across a mysterious red journal in the forest around Gravity Falls, he begins to adjust to life in town and starts going on adventures with his sister to unravel the supernatural secrets of the town as told by the entries in the journal.

Starting with "The Inconveniencing", Dipper is shown to have a crush on 15-year-old Mystery Shack cashier Wendy Corduroy. However, his attempts to win her over are usually sidetracked by accidents or supernatural phenomena. In the episode "Into the Bunker", Wendy confirms her suspicions of Dipper's crush, and though she explains that she is too old for Dipper at that time, they remain close friends.

Throughout the series, Dipper wears a trademark white and blue cap with a symbol of a blue pine tree logo in the front  of the hat, which he takes from the Shack's gift shop with his great-uncle ("Grunkle") Stan's permission. He also wears a navy blue vest, reddish orange T-shirt, gray shorts, black sneakers, and a wristwatch. "Double Dipper" reveals that his nickname comes from a birth mark on his forehead in the form of the Big Dipper, which he hides with his bangs.

Alternate versions
In "Close Rick-counters of the Rick Kind" the 2014 penultimate episode of the first season of the American science fiction comedy television series Rick and Morty, created by Justin Roiland and Dan Harmon, directed by Stephen Sandoval, and written by Ryan Ridley, twin girl and boy versions of protagonist Mortimer Chauncey "Morty" Smith, modelled after Mabel and Dipper Pines, are featured in the background of the episode in Easter egg cameo appearances, subsequently named as Mortabel and Mortipper Pines–Smith by Gravity Falls creator Alex Hirsch, with both featuring as playable characters in the role-playing video game Pocket Mortys, before later cameoing again in the third season episode "The Ricklantis Mixup".

In the Gravity Falls: Lost Legends storyline Don't Dimension It by Alex Hirsch and Serina Hernandez, a combined version of Dipper and Mabel known as Mabipper Pines is introduced as one of the many alternate versions of Mabel trapped in a pocket dimension, who join the primary reality Mabel in confronting the Anti-Mabel and returning the primary reality Mabel to her Grunkles Stan and Ford. On her return, Mabel apologizes to Dipper for her past selfishness and gives him a blue journal with a pine tree on it which she got from Mabipper, hoping to start new adventures together again in the aftermath of "Weirdmageddon 3: Take Back The Falls".

References

External links

 Official website of Gravity Falls - Characters 

Animated characters introduced in 2012
Animated human characters
Child characters in television
Fictional amateur detectives
Fictional American Jews
Fictional characters based on real people
Fictional characters from San Francisco Bay Area
Fictional characters who have made pacts with devils
Fictional explorers
Fictional twins
Gravity Falls characters
Male characters in animated series
Male characters in television
Television characters introduced in 2012